Mahtari Ziyarat (also Romanized as Mahtārī Zīyārat) is a village in Jahadabad Rural District, in the Central District of Anbarabad County, Kerman Province, Iran. At the 2006 census, its population was 543, in 124 families.

References 

Populated places in Anbarabad County